Dirt Trax FX is a racing video game developed by Sculptured Software and released by Acclaim Entertainment for the Super Nintendo Entertainment System in 1995. The 3D graphics of the game were made possible by the Super FX powered GSU-1, which was built into the cartridge.

Gameplay

The player can choose between eight different riders with unique characteristics and four bikes ranging from 50cc to 500cc. There are 22 tracks with four difficulty levels of gameplay.

The game allows two players to play simultaneously.

Release
In October of 2018, the game's rights were acquired by Canadian production company Liquid Media Group along with other titles originally owned by Acclaim Entertainment.

Reception 

GamePros Grease Monkey said the game has fast, smooth scrolling but blocky visuals. He criticized the lack of realism, particularly that there are no falls or crashes, and felt the way the soundtrack changes according to what's going on in the race made the sound too chaotic. He concluded: "Dirt Trax FX is a fun game, but serious gear heads will pass in favor of more lifelike motorcycle excitement".

References

1995 video games
Multiplayer and single-player video games
Off-road racing video games
Super FX games
Super Nintendo Entertainment System games
Super Nintendo Entertainment System-only games
Video games developed in the United States